Blink or Blink Indonesia is a musical group from Jakarta, Indonesia. Blink formed in Jakarta on 23 July 2011. They later appeared in the musical television series called Putih Abu-Abu in 2012. They started their career by carrying Pop and Jazz stream and eventually mixed with electropop.

Blink consists of four people: Alyssa Saufika Umari (Ify), Sivia Azizah (Sivia), Agatha Pricilla (Pricilla), and Febby Rastanty (Febby). All of them play acoustic instruments, and sing.

History
The band often perform cover versions of other songs to practice a cappella, including Firework by Katy Perry, and What Makes You Beautiful by One Direction.

2011-2012: Debut and Putih Abu Abu
Their first television appearance was on RCTI on 14 August 2011, with their first single, titled "Sendiri Lagi" which directly improvised by Sivia and Ify.

Then they are invited to perform at Inbox SCTV on 20 August 2011. In addition to singing songs, they performed an a cappella cover of the song Price Tag.

They released their second single titled "Dag Dig Dug" on 19 November 2011 at Inbox SCTV. Through that single, they was asked to be the central character in the musical television series Putih Abu-Abu, and their single became the theme song for that television series, which aired on SCTV.

On the series Putih Abu-Abu the band released their songs one by one, with at least three versions of each song, the acoustic (live), pop, and electropop.

They performed in the Putih Abu-Abu Music Concert (musical concert version of the television series) on SCTV, followed with their next concert, Putih Abu-Abu Music Concert, 2nd Chapter.

While appearing in the Putih Abu-Abu series, they also held concerts, while maintaining their school studies, as all of them were high school students, aged 15–16 years old.

Discography

Singles

Albums
 BLINK (2013)
 Heart Beat (2015)

Mini Albums and CDs
 SOPHIE & BLINK (2013)

Concert Tours

Putih Abu Abu
 Putih Abu Abu Concert
 Putih Abu Abu Concert Chapter 2

Concert participation
 SMASH Special Concert: Ready to Blast
 SMASH Concert: Step Forward
 K20 Concert Special Melly Goeslaw
 Masterpiece of Koes Plus
 Konser Lagu Anak
 Purwacaraka Music Studio's 25th Anniversary Concert

Videography

Music videos
 Sendiri Lagi (2011)
 Hellow Mellow (2013)

References

Musical groups from Jakarta
Indonesian pop music groups
Indonesian girl groups
Musical groups established in 2011
2011 establishments in Indonesia